Norman J. Wagner is an American engineer, currently the UNIDEL Robert L. Pigford Chair of Chemical and Biomolecular engineering at the University of Delaware. He holds a joint professorship to the Department of Physics and Astronomy as well as a professorship in the Department of Biomechanics and Movement Science.

Education
He gained a bachelor's degree at Carnegie Mellon University in 1984. He was awarded a doctorate in 1988 at Princeton University and a Director's Postdoctoral Fellowship, Los Alamos National Laboratory, in 1990.

Career
He served as chair of the Chemical and Biomolecular Engineering Department at the University of Delaware from 2007 to 2012. He has held visiting professorship at ETH Zurich (1997) and the University of Rome (2004).

Awards
He was awarded the Bingham Medal in 2014 by the Society of Rheology.
He received the Sustained Research Prize in 2018 from the Neutron Scattering Society of America.

References

Year of birth missing (living people)
Living people
Fellows of the American Association for the Advancement of Science
University of Delaware faculty
21st-century American engineers
Carnegie Mellon University alumni
Princeton University alumni